Andrew Lake or Lake Andrew may refer to:

Andrew Lake (Alaska), a lake on Adak Island
Lake Andrew (Douglas County, Minnesota), a lake in Douglas County
Andrew Lake (Kandiyohi County, Minnesota), a lake
Lake Andrew Township, Kandiyohi County, Minnesota